Harry Steven Durbano (December 12, 1951 – November 16, 2002) was a Canadian professional ice hockey player noted for his villainous behaviour on the ice and his larger-than-life persona off it.

Career
Born in Toronto, Durbano rose through minor hockey to a place on the Toronto Marlboros of the Ontario Hockey Association. He was drafted by the New York Rangers in the first round of the 1971 NHL Amateur Draft. He never played a game for the Rangers, though, and was traded to the St. Louis Blues where he began his career. Durbano quickly gained a reputation for being one of the toughest players in the league, amassing 1,411 major league-career penalty minutes, including an NHL-leading 370 PIM in the 1975–76 season.

He played 220 NHL games over the course of his career for St. Louis as well as the Pittsburgh Penguins, Kansas City Scouts and Colorado Rockies, along with 45 games in the World Hockey Association for the Birmingham Bulls.

In the very first game of the 1974–75 season, he was checked by Philadelphia Flyers defenceman Andre Dupont and suffered a fractured
left wrist. He missed the rest of the season, and though he returned the following season, he never regained full power in the wrist.

Post-career and death
Durbano last played in the NHL in the 1978–79 season. He was arrested on February 7, 1981, at Toronto International Airport aboard an Air Canada flight from Miami; the Royal Canadian Mounted Police seized about 474 grams of cocaine, estimated by police to be worth about $71,000. Durbano was convicted for cocaine smuggling in 1984, and was sentenced to seven years in prison. Durbano also admitted to using cocaine regularly while playing in the NHL. After his release, he was arrested once for shoplifting, and, in 1995, he was sent back to prison after he attempted to recruit an undercover police officer into an escort service in Welland, Ontario. He later moved to the Northwest Territories to seek a calmer life, and died there on November 16, 2002 of liver cancer at the age of 50.

Career statistics

References

External links

1951 births
2002 deaths
Birmingham Bulls players
Canadian ice hockey defencemen
Colorado Rockies (NHL) players
Kansas City Scouts players
National Hockey League first-round draft picks
New York Rangers draft picks
Pittsburgh Penguins players
Salt Lake Golden Eagles (CHL) players
St. Louis Blues players
Sportspeople convicted of crimes
Ice hockey people from Toronto
Toronto Marlboros players
Canadian expatriate ice hockey players in the United States
Canadian drug traffickers